Government Medical College Badaun, UP, also known as Badaun Medical College, is a full-fledged tertiary government Medical college and hospital. It is located at Badaun in Uttar Pradesh. The college imparts the degree of Bachelor of Medicine and Surgery (MBBS). The yearly undergraduate student intake is 100.

Courses
Government Medical College Badaun, UP undertakes the education and training of 100 students in MBBS courses.

Affiliated
The college is affiliated with Atal Bihari Vajpayee Medical University and is recognized by the National Medical Commission.

References

Medical colleges in Uttar Pradesh
Educational institutions established in 2019
2019 establishments in Uttar Pradesh